Paulo Cezar Costa (born 20 July 1967) is a Brazilian prelate of the Catholic Church who has been Metropolitan Archbishop of Brasilia since December 2020. He has been a bishop since 2010 and served as Bishop of São Carlos from 2016 to 2020.

On 27 August 2022 Pope Francis made Costa a cardinal.

Biography
Paulo Cezar Costa was born on 20 July 1967 in Valença, Brazil. He completed his studies in philosophy at the Nossa Senhora do Amor Divino Seminary in Petrópolis and his theology studies at the Higher Institute of Theology of the Archdiocese of Rio de Janeiro. He then studied at the Pontifical Gregorian University in Rome from 1996 to 2001, earning a licentiate and a doctorate in dogmatic theology. He was ordained a priest of the Diocese of Valença on 5 December 1992.

He worked as parish vicar in Paraíba do Sul in 1993; pastor of the Parish of São Sebastião dos Ferreiros in Vassouras from 1994 to 1996; pastor of the Parish of Santa Rosa de Lima in Valença from 2001 to 2006; director and professor of the Department of Theology of the Pontifical Catholic University of Rio de Janeiro (PUC-Rio) from 2007 to 2010; and rector of the Paulo VI Interdiocesan Seminary and director of the Paulo VI Institute of Philosophy and Theology in Nova Iguaçu from 2006 to 2010.

On 24 November 2010, Pope Benedict XVI appointed him titular bishop of Oescus and auxiliary bishop of the Archdiocese of Rio de Janeiro. He received his episcopal consecration on 5 February 2011. He was named to the Commission for the Doctrine of the Faith of the Brazilian Bishops' Conference in June of that year. He was vicar general of the Archdiocese and led the Suburban Vicariate while filling various administrative roles; he was a member of the University Council of the PUC-Rio and the Fundação Mantenedora Padre Anchieta; and he taught at the Archdiocesan Seminary and PUC-Rio.

On 22 June 2016, Pope Francis named Costa Bishop of São Carlos. He was installed there on 6 August. He was named a member of the Pontifical Commission for Latin America on 20 April 2020 and of the Pontifical Council for Promoting Christian Unity on 4 July 2020.

On 21 October 2020, Pope Francis appointed him Archbishop of Brasilia. He was installed there on 12 December.

Within the Brazilian Episcopal Conference he is a member of the Permanent Council and of the Episcopal Commission for Culture and Education. In November 2019, he was elected to the board of consulting bishops who guide the work of CELAM.

On 27 August 2022, Pope Francis made him a cardinal priest, assigning him the title of Santi Bonifacio ed Alessio.

See also
 Cardinals created by Pope Francis

Notes

References

External links
 
 
   

Living people
1967 births
People from Valença, Rio de Janeiro
Pontifical Gregorian University alumni
21st-century Roman Catholic bishops in Brazil
Roman Catholic archbishops of Brasília
Roman Catholic bishops of São Sebastião do Rio de Janeiro
Roman Catholic bishops of São Carlos
Brazilian cardinals
Cardinals created by Pope Francis